Elbe Day, April 25, 1945, is the day Soviet and American troops met at the Elbe River, near Torgau in Germany, marking an important step toward the end of World War II in Europe. This contact between the Soviets, advancing from the east, and the Americans, advancing from the west, meant that the two powers had effectively cut Germany in two.

Elbe Day has never been an official holiday in any country, but in the years after 1945 the memory of this friendly encounter gained new significance in the context of the Cold War between the U.S. and the Soviet Union.

History
The first contact between American and Soviet patrols occurred near Strehla, after First Lieutenant Albert Kotzebue, an American soldier, crossed the River Elbe in a boat with three men of an intelligence and reconnaissance platoon. On the east bank they met forward elements of a Soviet Guards rifle regiment of the First Ukrainian Front, under the command of Lieutenant Colonel Alexander Gordeyev. The same day, another patrol under Second Lieutenant William Robertson with Frank Huff, James McDonnell and Paul Staub met a Soviet patrol commanded by Lieutenant Alexander Silvashko on the destroyed Elbe bridge of Torgau.

On April 26, the commander of the 69th Infantry Division of the First Army, Emil F. Reinhardt, and the commander of the 58th Guards Rifle Division of the 5th Guards Army, Vladimir Rusakov, met at Torgau, southwest of Berlin. Arrangements were made for the formal "Handshake of Torgau" between Robertson and Silvashko in front of photographers the following day, April 27.

The Soviet, American, British and French governments released simultaneous statements that evening in London, Moscow, and Washington, reaffirming the determination of the Allied powers to complete the destruction of the Third Reich.

Commemorations

Monuments at Torgau, Lorenzkirch, and Bad Liebenwerda commemorate the first encounters between U.S. and Soviet troops on Elbe Day. In the United States, a "Spirit of the Elbe" plaque at Arlington National Cemetery commemorates the day.

In 1949 the Soviet film studio Mosfilm commemorated Elbe Day in the black-and-white film Encounter at the Elbe.

During the Cold War the meeting of the two armies was often recalled as a symbol of peace and friendship between the people of the two antagonistic superpowers. For example, in 1961 the popular Russian song "Do the Russians Want War?" evoked the memory of American and Soviet soldiers embracing at the Elbe River.

Joseph Polowsky, an American soldier who met Soviet troops on Elbe Day, was deeply affected by the experience and devoted much of his life to opposing war. He commemorated Elbe Day each year in his hometown of Chicago and unsuccessfully petitioned the United Nations to make April 25 a "World Day of Peace". His remains are buried in a cemetery in Torgau.

American singer-songwriter Fred Small commemorated Joseph Polowsky and Elbe Day in his song "At The Elbe".

In 1988 a plaque titled "Der Geist der Elbe" ("Spirit of the Elbe") was mounted on a stone near Torgau at the site of the encounter between troops of the U.S. 69th Infantry and the Soviet Guards.

In 1995 the Russian Federation issued a three-ruble coin commemorating the 50th anniversary of Elbe Day.

By 2010, the 65th anniversary of the event, Elbe Day events in Torgau were held annually on the weekend closest to April 25, attracting tourists to the city. Also in 2010, the U.S. and Russian presidents for the first time issued a joint statement on April 25 commemorating Elbe Day.

The meeting at the Elbe is represented in the war strategy game R.U.S.E., released in 2010 and 2011 and based loosely on World War II events.

See also
 Joseph Polowsky
 Line of contact

Citations

References

External links

 The War is Over - American and Russian troops meet at the Elbe, A People At War, U.S. National Archives and Records Administration
 Nora FitzGerald, Elbe Day commemorated 26 April 2010, Russia Beyond the Headlines, article with photos slideshow.
 "Remembering War" simulcast between US and USSR / Satellite Linkup to Reunite Soviet and American WW II Vets - UCSD press release April 29, 1985

Aftermath of World War II in Germany
Soviet Union–United States relations
1945 in Germany
Torgau
Elbe
April observances
April 1945 events in Europe